Feel may refer to:

Feeling

Music

Bands
Feel (New York band), a dance and R&B band
Feel (Polish band), a pop rock band

Songs
"Feel" (Kendrick Lamar song), 2017
 "Feel", by Phora, 2018
"Feel", by Mahmut Orhan, 2016
"Feel" (Kumi Koda song), 2006
"Feel" (Robbie Williams song), 2002
"Feel", by Big Star from #1 Record
"Feel", by Bombay Bicycle Club
"Feel", by Bradley Joseph from Rapture
"Feel", by Chicago
"Feel", by Jacob Collier and Lianne La Havas from Djesse Vol. 2
"Feel", by Matchbox Twenty from More Than You Think You Are
"Feel", by Sleeping with Sirens from Feel
"Feel", by Stereophonics from Language. Sex. Violence. Other?
"Feel", by Syd Barrett from The Madcap Laughs
"Feel", by Teenage Fanclub from Man-Made
"Feel", by The Verve from The Verve E.P.
"Feel", by Victoria Duffield

Albums
Feel (Feel album)
Feel (George Duke album), 1974
Feel (Glenn Hughes album), 1995
Feel (Human Drama album), 1989
Feel, Nagisa ni te album, 2002
Feel (Namie Amuro album)
Feel (Roachford album)
Feel (Sleeping with Sirens album)

Other
Friendly Enough Expression Language, as specified in DMN
Feel (animation studio), a Japanese animation studio
Feel Air, a Norwegian airline
Feel, the prototype name for the Mega Drive platform video game Ristar

See also
Feels (disambiguation)